The French Immersion School of Washington, founded in 1999, is an American non-profit, bilingual day school for children ages 2½ to 11 years old. The school adheres to the curriculum of the French Ministry of Education.

The school is located in Bellevue, Washington.

The French Immersion School of Washington is one of only approximately 40 French-American bilingual schools in the United States and is a member of the Pacific Northwest Association of Independent Schools.

See also
 Agence pour l'enseignement français à l'étranger, the Wikipedia article on French education abroad
 Education in France

External links

Pacific Northwest Association of Independent Schools

1999 establishments in Washington (state)
AEFE accredited schools
Bilingual schools in the United States
Education in Bellevue, Washington
Educational institutions established in 1999
French-American culture
Private elementary schools in Washington (state)